The Sri Lanka national cricket team toured Zimbabwe in April and May 2004 to play 2 Test matches and 5 Limited Overs Internationals. The next time Zimbabwe played Sri Lanka in a Test match was in October 2016.

Squads

ODI series

1st ODI

2nd ODI

3rd ODI

4th ODI

5th ODI

Test series

1st Test

2nd Test

References

2004 in Sri Lankan cricket
2004 in Zimbabwean cricket
International cricket competitions in 2004
2004
Zimbabwean cricket seasons from 2000–01